Ant & Dec's Saturday Night Takeaway (referred to simply as Saturday Night Takeaway or SNT) is a British television variety show, created and presented by Anthony McPartlin and Declan Donnelly (colloquially known as Ant & Dec), and broadcast on ITV since its premiere on 8 June 2002, enduring a four-year hiatus between 2009 and 2013, while its presenters worked on other projects. The show's format, heavily influenced by previous Saturday night light entertainment shows such as Noel's House Party, Opportunity Knocks and Don't Forget Your Toothbrush, focuses on a mixture of live and pre-recorded entertainment and quiz segments, including an audience-based quiz involving the television adverts during a week's episode of one of ITV's programmes, and a competition in each series between the two presenters.

The programme proved an immense success for the broadcaster since its launch, earning several awards including Most Popular Entertainment Programme at the National Television Awards and the BAFTA for Entertainment Programme in 2013, as well as earning awards for the presenters. Its success led to several international versions being created, though most have been short-lived, as well as a special mini-series of episodes involving an adventure of Ant & Dec, that were later broadcast as a special episode during the Christmas TV season. An official Saturday Night Takeaway iOS app for iPod, iPhone and iPad was released on 15 February 2013. From the thirteenth series until the fifteenth, and later the nineteenth, the series finale was broadcast outside the UK, having led to a 'Place on the Plane' segment. This did occur in the sixteenth series, but the trip was cancelled due to the COVID-19 pandemic. For the seventeenth and eighteenth series, this segment was replaced by 'Takeaway Getaway' where winners are given the opportunity to take an all-inclusive holiday courtesy of TUI. The show celebrated its 100th episode on 3 March 2018. The programme returned on 19 February 2022 for its eighteenth series. Dec confirmed in the finale of the eighteenth series that Saturday Night Takeaway will return in 2023 for its nineteenth series.

Up until 2018, episodes were broadcast live from Studio 1 at The London Studios. Following the permanent closure of the site after the fifteenth series, the programme moved to Studio TC1 at the Television Centre in West London in 2020. The sixteenth series is the only series in the programme's history to feature pre-recorded episodes, due to the COVID-19 pandemic. Saturday Night Takeaway returned for its seventeenth series on 20 February 2021 with a virtual video wall, and an ITV Hub-exclusive spin-off, Saturday Night Takeaway: Extra Helping 
featuring extra, unseen material from various in-show segments.

Format

The general set up for each episode is a selection of segments consisting of specially crafted games, comedy/entertainment films, participation by either a studio audience member, or unsuspecting viewer/public member, and a show finale consisting of a performance by a musician, dance group, singer, or group performers. Episodes of Saturday Night Takeaway are broadcast live during the weekend, during a prime time slot on Saturday evenings for the entire run of a series. Each episode is introduced with a line-up of what segments will be featured during its broadcast, along with an introduction of the hosts themselves (Series 1 only had the latter at the start)  – from the seventh series onwards, this responsibility was given to a special celebrity announcer, who would not only give an introduction of themselves and the hosts, but would also state what viewers would expect in the show for that episode, along with an update on what was still to come before each commercial break in the programme. Prior to 2022, the opening titles were usually preceded by a cold open scene involving the hosts performing a comedy sketch, similar to the cold openings of U.S. light entertainment programme Saturday Night Live and usually with celebrity guests for the episode, which ended with them or the celebrities saying – "Roll the titles!"

Segments
Throughout the show's history, the programme has featured a variety of segments, some based on notable elements in Saturday night TV. However, Saturday Night Takeaway features a regular selection of segments that it uses frequently in the majority of its episodes. These segments include:

 An Audience Member's Game (Series 2 – present) – Played at the beginning of an episode, the segment focuses on the presenters initially picking on certain audience members over something embarrassing about them. However, the last person picked takes part in a specially themed game just for them when Ant says "I think you better come with me as we play…", in which they receive a prize regardless of the outcome. Research for the game is usually by the production team via input from relations and close friends who nominated the participant.
 Ant vs. Dec – (Series 5 – present) Played throughout a series, the presenters compete against each other in a number of themed challenges in which neither presenter knows what each challenge is about. The winner of the game earns a point, and at the end of the series the winner is the one with the highest score; the loser is forced to undertake a forfeit during the series finale. The segment originally was designed as a surprise challenge for the two presenters, entitled "What's Next", in which neither pair knew what the challenge was, but had to work together to complete it. Between the eighth and ninth series, the presenters were joined by a team of celebrities who partook in the games. The segment is joined by a co-presenter, who gives out the rules and relays the results of the challenge, and is sometimes joined by a commentator during the challenge.
 Ant & Dec Undercover – (Series 2 – Series 5, Series 10 – present) The presenters pull a prank on a selected celebrity, involving scripted scenes, such as a situation going wrong for their target. The prank would sometimes include the pair being on scene with their target, but in disguise. The footage is shown with the celebrity present in the studio to watch it and react. The segment was introduced in the second series, dropped after the fifth series, and then revived for the tenth series onwards. In 2003 Ant & Dec were disguised as two Jamaican women. In 2005 Ant & Dec were disguised as two black rappers Milk Z & Donkey Man. In 2020 Ant & Dec apologized for any offence caused by their blackface. The sketch was originally dropped in April 2005 when the celebrities had decided that they have been bamboozled long enough and that this was their last straw. In the final installment of the sketch' original run on 16 April 2005, Jonathan Wilkes got revenge payback on Ant & Dec as punishment for their stupid pranks, bamboozling the biggest celebrities of the generation and getting away with it.
 I'm a Celebrity ... Get Out of Me Ear! – (Series 10 – present) Similar to "Undercover" and introduced in the tenth series, the presenters give a celebrity a concealed earpiece, and task them with doing whatever the pair instruct them to do before unsuspecting public members. Such instructions often involving doing or saying anything bizarre, weird, or downright silly.
 Singalong Live – (Series 11 – present) The presenters surprise three unsuspecting viewers, who become contestants in a karaoke-style quiz. Each is tasked with singing a segment of a song that is being sung by its artist, whereupon they must correctly identify a word that is missing from it. If they correctly identify the missing word, the viewer wins £500. The segment was first introduced in the eleventh series.
 Read My Lips – (Series 13 – Series 15, Series 17 – present) This segment, introduced in the thirteenth series, focuses on a contestant answering questions from the guest announcer, via Skype. However, the announcer wears noise-cancelling headphones, so they have to read the contestant's lips to get the answer. If the contestant manages to get the announcer to say three correct answers, they win a place on the series finale taking place outside of the UK.
 Best Seats in the House/Sofa Watch - (Series 13–15, Series 18 – present) These segments focused on viewers participation in a special game that offers a place in the studio audience for the following episode, with the exception of the series' finale. The segment takes place during the initial minutes of the episodes, in which viewers are shown several sofas hidden in various locations in the UK, as shown by live-streaming via an on-site camera for each sofa. To win a place, the viewers must be within range of the location and be seated on the sofa in order to win when the presenters check to see who has found the sofas at a later stage in the episode. This segment made its return in Series 18 where there was only one sofa rather than the usual four, the winner (which was chosen at random) won a Takeaway Getaway.
 The Pandas – (Series 16 – Series 17) The boys go undercover as pandas, fooling children at locations such as Hamleys and London Zoo.
The Takeaway Rainbow — (Series 17 — present) This segment involves McPartlin and Donnelly lighting up a rainbow which starts outside the studio and ends at a mystery location. In 2021, viewers had to work out where the rainbow actually is and chosen at random, one person/household gets a Takeaway Getaway. The following series, the format of the segment changed, where the viewers had to go to the mystery location. The number of people is a certain number of people of allowance. Then, chosen at random a colour is chosen then McPartlin and Donnelly reveal the winner in a different way each and every week, then that person/household gets a Takeaway Getaway.
 Win the Ads – (Series 1 – present) Often the penultimate segment, a member of the audience is randomly selected to take part in a quiz to win a series of prizes. Prior to broadcast, an ITV programme that had been broadcast during the week is randomly selected, whereupon the adverts broadcast during its commercial break(s) are used to create the prizes. Before the quiz begins, the prizes are placed on a grid, concealed, and randomly rearranged, before being given a number. The contestant has 60 seconds (75 in Series 17) to answer as many questions as they can, based on that week's news stories, with each correct answer allowing the contestant to pick a number as their prize at the end. After time is up, the contestant is given the option to take their prizes or gamble for the chance of winning all the prizes if they correctly answer one final question. The segment was originally used during the first series, and featured three people competing for the chance to win up to twenty prizes, with a consolation prize of a toilet roll given to any contestant that gambled and lost. The segment didn't return until the tenth series, which retained most of the format, but in favour of just having one contestant. From the thirteenth series onwards, the format was amended again, reducing the number of prizes to sixteen and dropping the use of a consolation prize.
 "End of the Show" Show – (Series 10 – present) The final segment of an episode, it features an entertainment act. From the first series to the ninth, it was mostly a musical act performing their latest hit in the charts. When the show returned from its hiatus, the segment's format was changed to become a musical number that would be performed by the presenters alongside a special guest star(s).
 Happiest Minute of the Week – (Series 13 – present) Ant and Dec celebrate the Happiest Minute of the Week by giving prizes to members of their audience and viewers at home.
Win a Week Off Work (Series 16, Series 19 – present) – This segment involved Stephen Mulhern going to an office and has those who work there take part in various games with the last person standing winning a week off work and a holiday.
 Kiddie-oke — (Series 18 — present) Members of the audience are chosen to participate in a game in which they must find out what songs kids are singing
  Ring My Bell — (Series 18 — present) An audience member's doorbell can be seen and if that audience member recognises that as their house they have to shout, “ding dong that's my doorbell”. Then people who live next to that house have 45 seconds to bring a mystery item and ring the bell. If they do it in time, they and the audience member will win £500.
  On Air Dares — (Series 17 — present) Stephen Mulhern surprises TV and Radio presenters by entering their studios and asking them to do dares while on air, unknown to the viewer/listener at the time.
 Saturday Night at the Movies — (Series 17 – present) In this segment, a random family has to act out several movies using props/costumes. The guest announcer has to guess what movie they are acting out, each family and the announcer gets 45 seconds each to act/guess as many movies as they can possibly can. They get £250 for each one they get correct but if they get three movies correct that family wins a Takeaway Getaway. When it says, 'That's a wrap!' the times up.
 Who You Gonna Call? - (Series 19 — present) The SNT crew takes 50 audience members mobile phones away from them and one of the members of the audience gets chosen to play the game. In it, Fleur East has to call someone from that person's phone. They get £250 for each person that accepts the call, but if they get three accepted calls that person wins a place on the plane. However, if one person doesn't accept the call, the game ends and the player loses everything.
 The Takeaway Truck - (Series 19 — present) The Takeaway Truck gets driven to a location that's told to the viewers, and if they're near it, they have to get outside and find it. Similarly to Saturday Night at the Movies, a random contestant from a audience gets picked to try and guess what song that audience is dancing to by their dance moves without listening to it before time runs out. They get £250 for each one they get correct but if they get three songs correct that person wins a place on the plane.

Discontinued segments
The following is a list of segments used on the programme in the course of its history, that have since been retired:

 Grab the Ads (Series 1–9) – Run for nine series, the segment focused on one randomly chosen viewer taking part in a prize give out. Viewers are initially asked to phone in for a place in the segment, with the chosen viewer receiving one of nine prizes on offer. Each prize was hidden behind a number – 1 to 9 – and whichever number was chosen was the prize that viewer got. In the first series, the format focused on the viewer picking a number from a grid upon being chosen, but for the majority of series, the number was generated through a game that was played by a different celebrity; after the prize was revealed, the presenters would announce the viewer who had been chosen to receive it.  Its discontinuation came down to the production team opting to use the more commercial "Win the Ads" game when Saturday Night Takeaway returned for its tenth series.
 Banged Up with Beadle (Series 1) – This segment functioned liked a spoof of a reality show, in which each week, a different member of the public was chosen to spend seven days locked up in a dungeon at Spitbank Fort in the Solent, with Jeremy Beadle. When they appeared live in the episode on Saturday, they were given a task, in which they won £5,000 if successful. The segment featured a spin-off ITV2 show of the same name, presented by Donna Air and Brendan Courtney, to rival that of Channel 4's smash hit series Big Brother.
 Make Ant Laugh (Series 1) – This segment focused on a contestant chosen by the show, attempting to impress Ant by making him laugh. If they succeeded, they won a trophy, otherwise they were gunged on the episode. The format was similar in nature to the Challenge Ant segment of SMTV Live.
 Jim Didn't Fix It (Series 1–3) – This segment functioned as a spoof version of the format for Jim'll Fix It, in which an audience member who had written to Jimmy Savile in their youth for the means to fulfil their dreams but had never been lucky to receive it, were given the chance to realise their dreams years later.
 Home Run (Series 1–3; 15–16) – This segment focused on unsuspecting members of the public being surprised by the presenters at a public location they were in, shown to viewers and the studio audience via hidden cameras set up at the location. The members selected by the show take part in a race to get back to their home immediately for a cash prize of £3,000. The person(s), regardless of being successful, would then be forced to read an oath in which they stated that they must never go out on Saturday nights again. The segment was briefly revived as part of the programme's 100th episode celebrations in 2018.
 Opportunity Knocks, Again (Series 2–5) – Based upon Opportunity Knocks, the format focused on members of the studio audience, who had previously performed on the show, to repeat their act on Saturday Night Takeaway.
 Saturday Cash Takeaway (Series 3) – This segment focused on a member of the studio audience randomly selecting one of nine popular takeaways, each being delivered to their customers. The one chosen would then be stuffed with £1,000, which the unsuspecting customer could receive, along with their food, if they answered a question correctly from their front door.
 Saturday Night Pub Olympics (Series 4) – This segment focused the production team selecting a random pub across the country, in which a number of unsuspecting customers visiting it would be invited to take part in a series of sporting events, dubbed the "Saturday Night Pub Olympics". The members taking part are split into two teams and face other against each other in three different events, with Dickie Davies providing commentary on proceedings.
 Beat the Boys (Series 6–8) – This segment focused on the presenters competing against a pair of celebrities in a specially themed time-trail event. Each pair would drive around a specially created course in a specific type of vehicle, and attempt to set a fast lap time. For each episode that the segment was featured in, the course included a specially designed set of obstacles that both pairs had to complete correctly; any not completed correctly would incur a ten-second penalty to the pair's lap time.
 Jiggy Bank (Series 6–7) – This segment focused on a studio audience member being randomly chosen to take part in a game with a cash prize. The game focused on them riding a robotic pig, like a rodeo, and holding for as long as possible, with their time affecting the amount of money they won. A maximum of £5,000 was on offer, and any money not won went into a jackpot for "Grab the Ads".
 The Mouse Trap (Series 8–9) – This segment focused on a viewer being randomly picked to take part in a game. The chosen viewer is given one minute to collect as much cheese from a specially created maze as they could possibly get and escape the maze before time ran out. Each piece of cheese collected was worth £1,000, with a total of five pieces to collect. If the contestant failed to get out of the maze in time, they would lose and be locked in the maze by "Tiddles the Takeaway Cat".
 Escape from Takeaway Prison (Series 9) – This segment focused on twenty celebrities being imprisoned in a fictional prison of the show, in which they competed against each other in a series of games to win their freedom.
 Supercomputer (Series 10–13) – This segment had a supercomputer which would travel round Britain. Members of the public would come up to the computer and hit the red button on the front under the display to begin. The computer would then set a bunch of silly tasks (such as pretending to be a chicken). People who did well would be rewarded with a Takeaway boarding pass, if they didn't entertain the computer they would be given a lollipop as consolation. Despite ending in 2013, the computer made appearances in other segments for a couple more series.
 A Ticket To Slide (Series 12) – This segment focused on the presenters choosing a random member of the public to take part in a game in which they, along with their friends and family, had to collect keys while travelling down an inflatable slide. If enough keys were collected, the contestant would win tickets for a vacation to New York.
 Little Ant & Dec (Series 2−6, 10–14) – Two young "look-alikes" of the presenters, nicknamed "Little Ant" and "Little Dec", meet with celebrities and ask them blunt questions regarding various subjects, which sometimes bamboozled the interviewee into giving some surprisingly straight answers. From its introduction in the second series to the end of the sixth series, the look-alikes were played by James Pallister and Dylan McKenna-Redshaw. When the segment was revived for the tenth series onwards, both Pallister and McKenna-Redshaw were too old to resume their roles, leading to them being replaced by Neil Overend and Haydn Reid. The segment was dropped after the fourteenth series, when the production team decided that both Overend and Reid were too old to continue in these roles and should be allowed to focus on their education.
Make 'Em Laugh (Series 14) – This was a one-off segment featuring the presenters against Phillip Schofield & Holly Willoughby. In this game, they have to try and make each laugh out loud. In Round 3, the boys dressed up as Jayne Torvill and Christopher Dean, but they've failed to make them laugh. In Round 4 they dressed as the presenters pretending to present This Morning and they did made them laugh. The game ended in a draw (3-3), so Stephen Mulhern dressed as a woman and Ant & Dec laughed first, so that meant Schofield and Willoughby were the winners.
 In for a Penny (Series 14–15) – Hosted by Stephen Mulhern and pre-recorded before an episode, this segment focuses on members of public being approached by Mulhern and taking part in a special gameshow, so long as they can provide a penny. Each contestant takes part in five rounds – four focusing on different challenges, and the final focusing on stopping at a selected number of seconds (i.e. stopping between 9–10 seconds) – and should they complete all five, they win £1,000, otherwise the game ends. At the end of Series 15, ITV confirmed that the segment would be spun-off as its own show.

Filming
Filming for every episode is done both live, for studio segments and off-site broadcasts across the country, and pre-recorded for filmed segments. Live studio segments since the show premiered took place from Studio 1 at The London Studios, and included the backstage areas near to the studio for various sketches and banter by the presenters. Although the presenters are the primary cast members of Saturday Night Takeaway, the show also employs a variety of co-stars who would handle off-site segments. After 2018, live studio segments would cease to be conducted at London Studios following the conclusion of the fifteenth series, owing to the site's imminent closure and sale. Filming for the live studio segments were moved to Studio TC1 at the Television Centre in West London, operated and owned by BBC Studioworks, in time for the sixteenth series launch in February 2020. In March 2020, the programme suspended live studio segments, assigning these to pre-recording in the wake of the coronavirus pandemic.

In 2016, the production staff and the programme's creators decided to air live finales abroad in other locations, as part of a new prize-giving format involving the provision of travel holiday packages to lucky recipients within the audience and around the country. The first finale to be filmed under this new format element took place aboard the MV Britannia while it was docked in Spain during its cruise journey. The format's success led to further sites abroad being used including Walt Disney World, Florida in 2017, and Universal Orlando in 2018 and will return in 2023. However, the finale for the 2020 series was originally planned to return to Walt Disney World, but was later retained within the UK at the home of the presenters, due to the UK going into national lockdown, both as a precaution against the spread of the coronavirus and due to Disney closing the resort as a result of the pandemic.

Transmissions

Ant and Dec's Saturday Night Takeaway Presents...
Starting from the thirteenth series, the programme began airing a mini-serial with each series focused on light-hearted comedy mystery dramas starring Ant & Dec, and are primarily parodies of noted fiction genres from films and television programmes. The first serial, a parody of "whodunnit" crime mystery stories titled "Who Shot Simon Cowell?", focused on the presenters investigating the mysterious sudden shooting of Cowell at his birthday party. The popularity of the format for the programme led to additional serials being created: "The Missing Crown Jewels" for the fourteenth series, and "Saturday Knight Takeaway" for the fifteenth series (which was aired again on 2 January 2021), both parodies of the spy espionage genre of films, in which the presenters operated for the fictional organisation "Honoured" to investigate important cases; "Men in Brown" for the sixteenth series, a parody of the Men in Black film series, in which the presenters join a special organisation involved in dealing with extraterrestrial species on Earth, "Double Trouble" for the seventeenth series, "Polter Guys" for the eighteenth series and "Murder At Bigwig Manor" for the nineteenth series.

After the mini-serial is aired with each series, all episodes are later condensed into a special feature-length episode under the title of Ant and Dec's Saturday Night Takeaway Presents..., and broadcast in late December of that year.

Episodes and broadcast dates

 Who Shot Simon Cowell? (27 February 2016)
 The Missing Crown Jewels (25 February 2017)
 Saturday Knight Takeaway (3 March 2018)
 Men in Brown (29 February 2020)
 Double Trouble (27 February 2021)
 Polter Guys (26 February 2022)
 Murder At Bigwig Manor (4 March 2023)

Ant & Dec's Takeaway on Tour
On 31 October 2013, it was announced that a live tour of the show, under the title "Takeaway on Tour", would be co-produced between Ant & Dec, James Grant Live, and ITV Studios. Presented by the show's hosts, with Kim Gavin as the tour's artistic director, it featured appearances by various celebrities and performers and a number of segments from the programme, including an appearance by Ashley Roberts (who also performed at the shows) as the host of the tour's version of "Ant vs. Dec".

Demand for tickets was high, and led to extra dates and venues being added on 28 November 2013, along with some shows having their dates rearranged. The tour ran for only one series of shows, between 6 August – 13 September 2014 across various cities in the United Kingdom, which were: London, Cardiff, Birmingham, Leeds, Manchester, Glasgow, Belfast, Sheffield, Newcastle, Nottingham, Liverpool and Dublin.

International versions
The success of Saturday Night Takeaway led to the creation of a number of international versions:

 A Finnish version of the programme, entitled Huuma (Ecstasy in English) was aired on MTV3. Premiering in March 2005, it ran for four years before it was axed in 2009. The show featured its own take on notable segments, such as "Little Ant & Dec" and "Win the Ads", and featured various hosts presenting it. It was revived by MTV3 on 14 September 2019, and still continues to be broadcast.
 A Chinese version of the programme was launched on 11 January 2008. Entitled Friday Night Takeaway (快乐2008 in Chinese), it was broadcast on Hunan TV, and hosted by He Jiong and Ma Ke.
 Two German versions of the programme were created. The first version, made in 2005, was cancelled after just one episode was shown on Sat.1. The second version was launched on 29 August 2008, under the title Die Sonja & Dirk Show, and had better success. Created for RTL Television, it was hosted by Sonja Zietlow and Dirk Bach, both of whom were known for presenting the German version of I'm a Celebrity...Get Me Out of Here!, and featured a similar format to the British original in terms of segments. The programme ran for four years before it was axed, following the death of Bach on 1 October 2012.
 A Spanish version of the show, El supershow, was aired on Antena 3 in Summer 2004, presented by Carlos Sobera and Patricia Pérez. Starting on 21 July and lasting until late August, it was axed after one series despite getting good ratings.
 A Flemish version of the show, named "Alles Moet Weg" ("Everything has to go") was aired on the Belgian commercial channel VTM for one season. Hosted by Koen Wauters, the show ran for one season of six episodes, starting on 29 February 2008. It featured several segments copied from the British version like "the Jiggy Bank" and "versus" (here named "Koen Versus", where Koen would compete against a different Flemish celebrity each week.) and "Beat The Boys". The sixth and last episode aired on 4 April 2008.
 A Portuguese version named Sabadabadão was launched on 10 May 2014. Broadcast on SIC, and co-produced by FremantleMedia, it was hosted by Júlia Pinheiro and João Baião, and ran for only one series of twelve episodes before it was axed.
 An American version of the programme was launched on 15 September 2015. Announced the previous year on 27 October 2014, it was entitled Best Time Ever with Neil Patrick Harris (referred to also as Best Time Ever), presented by Neil Patrick Harris, and produced by NBC as part of their Tuesday night entry for 2015–16 television season. The show ran for one season, ending on 3 November 2015, before it was announced on 15 December, later that year, that it had been cancelled.
 A French version of the programme was launched on 11 February 2015. Announced the previous month, it was entitled Tout Peut Arriver ("Anything Could Happen"), aired on M6, and hosted by Guillaume Pley and Jerome Anthony. The show performed poorly in the ratings and was cancelled after airing three episodes, the third of which was aired on W9.
 In October 2015, Australian network Seven announced plans to create an Australian version of the British original, intended to be aired on Sundays under the title of Sunday Night Takeaway, though no further announcements were made by Seven following this, and their plans were later dropped amidst claims it was focusing efforts on another project. On 19 May 2018, Network Ten officially announced plans to create an Australian version, under the same proposed title, and to be hosted by Julia Morris and Chris Brown, both of whom host the Australian version of I'm a Celebrity...Get Me Out of Here!, later confirming that year on 9 September that the pair had been secured as hosts and that the show was intended to be broadcast in 2019. It was announced in early February that Chris & Julia's Sunday Night Takeaway would premiere on 24 February 2019.

Notes

References

External links 

 Official Ant & Dec website
 
 
 
 

2002 British television series debuts
2010s British television series
2020s British television series
Ant & Dec
BAFTA winners (television series)
English-language television shows
ITV game shows
London Weekend Television shows
Saturday mass media
Television series by ITV Studios